Z Camelopardalis (Z Cam) is a cataclysmic variable star system in the northern constellation of Camelopardalis. It has an apparent visual magnitude which varies between 9.8 and 14.5. This system is the prototype star for the family of Z Camelopardalis variable stars: dwarf novae with standstills at a brightness intermediate between their maxima and minima. It may be the same bright nova that was recorded by Chinese astrologers in the autumn of 77 BCE.

Z Camelopardalis was discovered photographically in 1904 by Henry Park Hollis during work for the Astrographic Catalogue. It is surrounded by an extensive shell thought to have been ejected in a nova explosion, the largest known of its type. The size and expansion of this shell sets a firm lower limit since the last eruption of at least 220 years.

Gallery

References

External links
 

G-type main-sequence stars
Dwarf novae
Camelopardalis (constellation)
Camelopardalis, Z
J08251318+7306391